The Lord of Caboet or Lord Arnau de Caboet was a Catalan nobleman. He played an influential role in the creation of Andorra, which was established by Charlemagne as one of the buffer states that kept the Moors from invading France. In 11th century, an account cited how the lord protected the Bishop of Urgel from military action conducted by neighboring lords through a defensive agreement. The title was fought over by the Bishop of Urgell and the Count of Foix, who became the heir of Lord Caboet through marriage. The lord's family later merged with the house of Castellbo with the marriage between Viscount Arnau de Castellbo and the lord's descendant Arnaua de Caboet.

References

History of Andorra
Catalan nobility

.